Brain Pathology is the medical journal of the International Society of Neuropathology, published for them by John Wiley & Sons.

According to the Journal Citation Reports, the journal has a 2020 impact factor of 6.508.

References

External links

English-language journals
Neurology journals
Publications established in 1990
Wiley (publisher) academic journals
Bimonthly journals